Baroo or Baru is a town and union council of Gujrat District, in the Punjab province of Pakistan. It is located at 32°45'20N 74°19'40E with an altitude of 267 metres (879 feet).

References

Populated places in Gujrat District
Union councils of Gujrat District